Kobro is a crater near the south pole of the planet Mercury. Its name was adopted by the International Astronomical Union (IAU) on the December 12, 2012. Kobro is named for the Polish sculptor Katarzyna Kobro.

References

Impact craters on Mercury